Trequinsin is a phosphodiesterase inhibitor. It has been shown to improve sperm motility in vitro.

References

Phosphodiesterase inhibitors